Cheshmeh-ye Bagh (also Romanized as Cheshmeh-ye Bāgh) is a village in Miyan Darband Rural District, in the Central District of Kermanshah County, Kermanshah Province, Iran. At the 2006 census, its population was 280, in 64 families.

References 

Populated places in Kermanshah County